The 2002 WNBA season was the sixth for the Charlotte Sting. The team advanced to the playoffs, but they were later swept in the opening round to the Washington Mystics.

Offseason

WNBA Draft

Regular season

Season standings

Season schedule

Player stats

References

Charlotte Sting seasons
Charlotte
Charlotte Sting